Xanthomonas alfalfae is a species of bacteria.

References 

Xanthomonadales
Bacteria described in 2007